Constantino da Vaprio (active 1453 - 1482) was an Italian painter of the Renaissance period.

Biography
He was born to a Giovanni from a family known also as degli Zenoni (or Zenone), originally from Vaprio d'Adda. Sources state Costantino was either born in Milan or Pavia

In 1453, he is documented as being patronized by the Duke Francesco Sforza. He is documented in 1461 as painting for the Pavia Cathedral. In 1475, he appears to share lodgings with Giacomino Vismara, Bonifacio Bembo, and Zanetto Bugatto in the parish of Santa Maria in Pertica, Pavia. Circa 1477, he was working with Vismara, Bembo and Vincenzo Foppa for a large ancona (no longer extant) to be placed in the chapel of the Castello Visconteo. Few works attributed to Costantino remain: including fragments of frescos from the church of Santa Chiara of Milan, and a Saint Monk in the Civic Museum of Lodi.

References

15th-century Italian painters
Italian male painters
Painters from Milan
Italian Renaissance painters
Year of death unknown
Year of birth unknown